Igor Anatolyevich Zelensky (also trans. Zelenski; ; born 13 July 1969) is a Russian ballet dancer.

Early life 
Zelensky was born on 13 July 1969, in Labinsk, Russian SFSR. He was a principal at the Mariinsky Ballet from 1991 until 2013. He graduated from the Tbilisi School of Ballet (class of Vakhtang Chabukiani) and trained at the Vaganova academy (class of Gennady Selutsky).

Career 
Zelensky was a principal for five years at the New York City Ballet. His roles include Romeo in Romeo and Juliet and Siegfried in Swan Lake. He has performed around the world, including with the Royal Ballet in London, at La Scala in Milan, at the Bayerische Staatsoper in Munich and with the New York City Ballet.

Zelensky served as the Artistic Director of the Novosibirsk Opera and Ballet Theatre (2006–2015) as well as the Stanislavski and Nemirovich-Danchenko Moscow Academic Music Theatre (2011–2016). From 2016 to 2022, he was the Ballet Director of the Bayerisches Staatsballett; he resigned on 4 April 2022 due to "private family reasons" after failing to denounce the 2022 Russian invasion of Ukraine, and was summoned by the German Science and Arts Ministry to explain his links to a cultural heritage foundation tied with the Russian state. Serge Dorny, the general director of Bavarian State Opera, had inadvertently told Russian pranksters Vovan and Lexus that Zelensky "didn't make that decision on his own", and said, "We had a conversation, and I brought him to this conclusion."

Personal life
Zelensky is reportedly the partner of Katerina Tikhonova, the second daughter of Russian president Vladimir Putin. They reportedly have a daughter, born 2017.

See also
 List of Russian ballet dancers

References

External links
 
 

1969 births
20th-century Russian ballet dancers
21st-century Russian ballet dancers
Living people
Family of Vladimir Putin
People from Labinsk
New York City Ballet principal dancers
Novosibirsk Opera and Ballet Theatre
Vaganova graduates
Honored Artists of the Russian Federation
People's Artists of Russia
Russian male ballet dancers
Soviet male ballet dancers